William Afred "Bill" Kindricks (July 24, 1946 – June 8, 2015) was an American football defensive tackle who played one season for the Cincinnati Bengals. He was also on the Oakland Raiders but did not play for them. In his second season he played in the Continental Football League for the Spokane Shockers.

References

1946 births
2015 deaths
Sportspeople from Tuskegee, Alabama
Players of American football from Alabama
Cincinnati Bengals players
American football defensive tackles
Alabama A&M Bulldogs football players